Dhanera is a city in Banaskantha district  in the northern part of the state of Gujarat, India. Longitude 240 – 310 degree North and latitude 120 – 020 degree east. It is close to the city of Deesa.Dhanera is an ancient part of Gujarat.
Formerly Dhakha was a village and later Dhanera Nagar was established.
Establishment of Dhanera town Devda Rajputs in the 16th century Did. Dhanera kingdom was first found by Devda's and they ruled it for more than 500 years and Dhanera was founded around approximately 710 years ago by Devda kings. Currently, it has a population of more than 60,000 and comes under Municipality. It is 32 km away from Deesa

History
Dhanera is one of the earliest settlements of North Gujarat.

Geography

Demographics
 Indian census, Dhanera had a population of 22,183. Males constitute 52% of the population and females 48%. Dhanera has an average literacy rate of 55%, lower than the national average of 59.5%. Male literacy is 67% and, female literacy is 42%. In Dhanera, 18% of the population is under 6 years of age.

Temples
Aashapura Temple Dhakha na darwaja rajput society,This temple was established by Shri vaghaji Karshanji Rajput, the small and very popular place in Dhanera.

The Temple of Satimata and sartansinghji rao is at near Bagicha. This is 337 years old temple in dhanera. Every year on 8 (asthami) of maha month Rao family arrange bhajan sandhya and prasad.

The temple of Shri Shanttinath Swami is approximately 150 to 200 years old.

The Samadhi Sthal of Sant Shri 1008 Ramabai Saheb is located near Mama Bapji Temple on Deesa-Dhanera State Highway. Thousands of people gathered here on Death Anniversary(Varsi) of Shri Ramabai Saheb here.

The temple of Shri Sundarpuri Maharaj is in the village of Valer, 8 km away from Dhanera. On the 5th (Panchami) of each month, people come to pray to Shri Sundarpuri Maharaj.

- The temple of shri 1008 jetgiriji maharaj in the village of JIVANA, 10 km away from Dhanera. on the 11th (agiyaras) of each month, people come to pray to jetgiriji maharaj.

The temple of Shree Dhakaniya mahadev and Shree Ashapura is in the village of Mewada, 18 km away from Dhanera.

The Shree Bramharishi Ashram is in the village of Ravi, 28 km away from Dhanera.

Panjrapole
Dhanera panjrapole is situated at Saral Village which is about 7 km from Dhanera. Initially, in 1953 on a very small scale it came to existence at mochi vas Dhanera and recently its shifted to a big place of around 220 viga at saral. Recently we have around 2700 animals consisting of cows/bull/goats/sheep. The annual expense is around 2.25 Cr

Transport

Rail
Dhanera Railway station on Jodhpur-Ahmedabad Line comes under the administrative control of Western Railway zone of the Indian Railways. It has direct rail links Gujarat cities Bhildi, Patan, Palanpur, mehsana, Ahmedabad, Surat and Rajasthan cities Raniwara, Bhinmal, Jalore, Jodhpur. There are several passenger train on this route for which passenger don't need Reservation.

Road
Dhanera is located on NH 168 & NH168A connecting Tharad, Deesa, Panthawada. Road Passes through Dhanera city. Public and Private Buses are available for Nearby Cities.

Air
The nearest Airport is the Deesa Airport, But there is no scheduled flights. It is just 34 km from Dhanera city. The nearest International Airport is Sardar Vallabhbhai Patel International Airport, Ahmedabad which is 203 km away from Dhanera.

Festivals

Every year Navratri,janamashthmi and other festival celebrated in Ashapura Temple rajput society.

Every year Janamashthmi is celebrated in Sudamapuri Society at Ramabai Aashram.  On the day of Labh Pancham(Panchami of Kartika) Bhandara(Public Lunch) is given at Ramabai Aashram.

References

Cities and towns in Banaskantha district